Amazing: The Best of Alex Lloyd is the first compilation album released in September 2006 by Australian singer-songwriter, Alex Lloyd.
The album peaked at number 34, becoming his fifth top 50 album, but first not to peak within the top 10.

Track listing
CD1
 "Amazing"	
 "Coming Home"
 "Never Meant to Fail"	
 "Beautiful"	
 "Black the Sun"	
 "Green"	
 "My Way Home" (remix)
 "Momo"	
 "Save My Soul" 	
 "Lucky Star"	
 "Bus Ride"	
 "Downtown"	
 "The Wonder"	
 "Everybody's Laughing"	
 "1000 Miles"	
 "Peepshow"	
 "Something Special"

CD2
 "A Break Outside"	
 "Once"	
 "Red Guitar"	
 "Pretenders"	
 "Waiting for the Youth to Come In"	
 "Backbird"	
 "Travel Log"	
 "Golden Slumbers"	
 "Distant Angels"	
 "Latino"	
 "Lucky Seven"	
 "Learning How to Run"	
 "Mystery Train"	
 "Summer Garden"	
 "Don't Let It Bring You Down"	
 "Self-Defence"

Charts

Weekly charts

References

Alex Lloyd albums
Compilation albums by Australian artists
2006 compilation albums
EMI Records albums